The New Synagogue of Graz, is a Jewish synagogue in the city of Graz, Austria. Within the city, it is located on David-Herzog-Place, on the right bank of the Mur River in the Gries neighborhood of Graz. The synagogue serves the Jews of Graz, Styria, Carinthia, and southern parts of Burgenland.

History 
Before the Second World War, the synagogue in Graz was the cultural and religious center of the city's 2000 Jews. Its defining feature was a 30 meter high dome on top of the building. The synagogue was destroyed on Kristallnacht, like the majority of Jewish sites in Germany and occupied Nazi territories at the time.

After the war, only about 150 Jews existed in Graz. In 1952, the Jewish community of Graz, dissolved in 1940, was re-founded. The community covers the States of Styria, Carinthia and the districts of Oberwart, Güssing and Jennersdorf in Burgenland.

The site of the former synagogue remained a vacant lawn until 1988. The city of Graz erected a commemorative stele in the form of a black obelisk, which was later included in the construction of the new synagogue..

In 1983, artist Fedo Ertl approached the Jewish community with the suggestion of clearing the foundation of the former synagogue site, but this suggestion was rejected due to fears of an antisemitic reaction from city officials. Ertl found that some of the bricks from the synagogue were reused as early as 1939 in the construction of a garage on Alberstraße.

The New Synagogue 
On October 21, 1998 all the parties in the Municipal Council of Graz unanimously decided to rebuild the synagogue in Graz. This decision was taken following the intervention of the then-president of the local Jewish community, Kurt David Brühl.

A couple of architects from Graz, Jörg and Ingrid Mayr, who had already been put in charge of a memorial for the destroyed Jewish cemetery of Graz, worked with Ertl's plans.

Approximately 9600 bricks of the former synagogue were reused in the new building, after being washed by over 150 students of the local state high school in Lichtenfelsgasse, the local vocational technical school, and the Grazbachgasse school of commerce, who worked for over 10,000 hours. An obelisk constructed on the site of the synagogue in 1988 was incorporated in the project and is now found under the Bimah. The new building was primarily made from brick, reinforced concrete and glass. The cube and sphere create a central space for the synagogue and help it stick out in its exterior appearance.

The new synagogue followed the blueprints of the old synagogue, but on a smaller scale than its predecessor, as the Jewish community of Graz numbered about a hundred members, compared to the 2000 members before World War II. The synagogue was consecrated and opened on November 9, 2000, the anniversary of Kristallnacht.

Architecture and conception 
While the building is largely modern architecture, the design of the synagogue does recall several general aspects of the synagogue destroyed by the Nazis.

In the middle of the sanctuary rests a glass Bimah where the Torah is read. Behind the Bimah is the Torah ark where the Torah scrolls are stored. This space is dominated by a glass dome supported by twelve metal pillars (representing the Twelve Tribes of Israel) and creating a Star of David-shaped cupola on the ceiling. The clear blue glass is meant to invoke the unobstructed skies. Hebrew prayers are engraved into the glass through sandblasting.

The synagogue is located at David Herzog Place, named after the last Rabbi for Styria and Carinthia before the Second World War, who escaped Graz after Kristallnact and sought refuge in England.

The Jewish community today 
In 2013, the Jewish community of Graz was dissolved following long-term internal conflicts. The synagogue, community center, and other community assets were made part of the Jewish Cultural Foundation of Styria, Carinthia and Southern Burgenland. The community itself was turned into a subsidiary organization of the Jewish Community of Vienna, with responsibilities for the areas covered by the Jewish Cultural Foundation. Since 2016, the organization is headed by a delegate with the title of "president". That position is currently held by Elie Rosen, a well-known member of the Austrian Jewish community.

At the insistence of Rosen, and following the agreement of the Jewish communities of Graz and Vienna and the Chief Rabbi of Vienna, the Rabbinate of Styria (with jurisdiction over Styria, Carinthia, and Burgenland) which had been dissolved in 1938, was re-established on December 1, 2016. That same day, for the first time since 1938, Vienna Rabbi Schlomo Hofmeister was named Chief Rabbi of Graz.

References

Links 

21st-century synagogues
Religious buildings and structures completed in 2000
Synagogues in Austria